Mercedes Muñoz Sampedro (1896–1979) was a Spanish stage and film actress.

She was the mother of the actress Carmen Lozano. Her sisters Matilde Muñoz Sampedro and Guadalupe Muñoz Sampedro were also both actresses. She died on 4 February 1975.

Selected filmography
 Service at Sea (1951)
 Airport (1953)
 Luxury Cabin (1959)

References

Bibliography 
 Pascual Cebollada & Mary G. Santa Eulalia. Madrid y el cine: panorama filmográfico de cien años de historia. Consejería de Educación, Comunidad de Madrid, 2000.

External links 
 

1896 births
1979 deaths
Spanish film actresses
People from Madrid